This was the first edition of the tournament for women.

Manuela Maleeva won in the final 6–4, 6–1 against Jenny Byrne.

Seeds
A champion seed is indicated in bold text while text in italics indicates the round in which that seed was eliminated. The top four seeds received a bye to the second round.

  Chris Evert (second round)
  Helena Suková (semifinals)
  Pam Shriver (quarterfinals)
  Manuela Maleeva (champion)
  Lori McNeil (first round)
  Catarina Lindqvist (quarterfinals)
  Nicole Provis (second round)
  Nathalie Tauziat (second round)

Draw

Final

Section 1

Section 2

References
 1989 Virginia Slims of Indian Wells Draw

Virginia Slims of Indian Wells - Singles